This article is an overview of telecommunications in Malta.

Telephone

Telephones - main lines in use:
229,700 (2012)

Telephones - mobile cellular:
539,500  (2012)

Telephone system:
automatic system satisfies normal requirements
domestic:
submarine cables and microwave radio relay between islands
international:
2 submarine cables; satellite earth station - 1 Intelsat (Atlantic Ocean)

Radio

Radio broadcast stations:
AM 1, FM 18, shortwave 6 (1999)

Radios:
255,000 (1997)

Amateur radio operators:
Approx. 500

Amateur radio repeaters:
1 HF ALE EchoLink Gateway (9H1BBS-L) DTMF Access 145300 CTCSS 77 Hz (Owned by G0DEO/9H1IA)
1 VHF/UHF 9H1IA-L Frequency Agile CrossBand Link CTCSS 151.4 Hz (Owned by G0DEO/9H1IA)
1 VHF (9H1BBS 145.750 MHz CTCSS 77 Hz (Owned by G0DEO/9H1IA)
1 UHF (9H1BBS 433.175 MHz CTCSS 77 Hz (Owned by G0DEO/9H1IA)
2 Microwave Amateur Television ( ATV ) Repeaters ( 9H1ATV built by 9H1LO and run by MARL and 9H1LO/r built and run by 9H1LO )

Amateur radio beacons:
1 HF 6 Meater Beacon 9H1SIX 50.023 MHz JM75fv (Run by MARL Club)
1 HF 10 Meter Band CW Beacon 9H1LO/B on 28.223 MHz
1 HF 30 Meter Band QRSS Beacon 9H1LO/B on 10.140.90 MHz
1 HF 17 Meter Band PSK31 Beacon 9H1LO/B on 18.110.15 MHz
1 VHF 2 Meter Band Beacon 9H1LO/B on 144.500 MHz (currently summer months only)

Television

Television broadcast stations:
6 (2000)

Televisions:
280,000 (1997)

Internet

Internet Service Providers (ISPs):
17 (2005)

Broadband Wireless Internet Service Provider Licenses:
3 (2005)

Internet users:
240,600  (2009)

Country code (Top level domain): .mt

References